Hannah Kigusiuq (1931-1995) was an Inuk artist. Kigusiuq was born at Hanningajuq (Garry Lake), Northwest Territories (now Nunavut). She is known for her drawings and prints.

Her work is included in the collections of the National Gallery of Canada, the Winnipeg Art Gallery, the Musée national des beaux-arts du Québec and the McMichael Canadian Art Collection.

References

1931 births
1995 deaths
20th-century Canadian women artists
Inuit artists
Artists from Nunavut
Artists from the Northwest Territories
People from Baker Lake